Mecklenburg County is a county located in the southwestern region of the state of North Carolina, in the United States. As of the 2020 census, the population was 1,115,482, making it the second-most populous county in North Carolina (after Wake County) and the first county in the Carolinas to surpass one million in population.  Its county seat is Charlotte, the state's largest city.

Mecklenburg County is the central county of the Charlotte-Concord-Gastonia, NC-SC Metropolitan Statistical Area. On September 12, 2013, the county welcomed its one millionth resident.

Like its seat, the county is named after Charlotte of Mecklenburg-Strelitz, Queen of the United Kingdom (1761–1818), whose name is derived from the region of Mecklenburg in Germany, itself deriving its name from Mecklenburg Castle (Mecklenburg meaning "large castle" in Low German) in the village of Dorf Mecklenburg.

History
Mecklenburg County was formed in 1762 from the western part of Anson County, both in the Piedmont section of the state. It was named in commemoration of the marriage of King George III to Charlotte of Mecklenburg-Strelitz, for whom the county seat Charlotte is named. Due to unsure boundaries, a large part of south and western Mecklenburg County extended into areas that would later form part of the state of South Carolina. In 1768, most of this area (the part of Mecklenburg County west of the Catawba River) was designated Tryon County, North Carolina.

Determining the final boundaries of these "western" areas between North and South Carolina was a decades-long process. As population increased in the area following the American Revolutionary War, in 1792 the northeastern part of Mecklenburg County was taken by the North Carolina legislature for Cabarrus County. Finally, in 1842 the southeastern part of Mecklenburg County was combined with the western part of Anson County to form Union County.

The Mecklenburg Declaration of Independence was allegedly signed on May 20, 1775, and if the document is genuine, Mecklenburg County was the first part of the Thirteen Colonies to declare independence from Great Britain. The "Mecklenburg Resolves" were adopted on May 31, 1775. Mecklenburg continues to celebrate the Meck Dec each year in May. The date of the Mecklenburg Declaration is also listed on the flag of North Carolina, represented by the date of May 20, 1775 as one of two dates on the Flag of North Carolina.

in 1917, during World War I, Camp Greene was established west of Charlotte as a training camp for the army, it was later decommissioned. Around the 1930s and 40s, the population began to rapidly, during this time, Charlotte Memorial Hospital and Charlotte College (Now UNCC) were built. Lake Norman was also completed in 1964 after a 5 year construction period.

In the mid-20 century, the county continued to see rapid growth. Many new government building were constructed, Charlotte Douglas International Airport was also expanded in 1954. By 1960, a quarter million people were living in the county with that number hitting half a million by 1990. An unsuccessful attempt to form a Consolidated city-county government was tried in 1971, but was voted down residents. The Metropolitan Statistical Area now includes 6 counties in both North and South Carolina with a combined population of 2,595,027 in 2020.

It is one of the largest gasoline spills in U.S. history and cleanup efforts are expected to last for several years.

Geography

State and local protected areas/sites
 Carowinds (partially in South Carolina)
 Historic Latta Plantation
 Historic Rural Hill/Nature Preserve
 President James K. Polk Historic Site

Nature preserves in Charlotte:
 Auten Nature Preserve
 Cowans Ford Wildlife Refuge
 Ferrelltown Nature Preserve
 Latta Nature Preserve
 McDowell Nature Preserve
 Possum Walk Nature Preserve
 Reedy Creek Nature Preserve
 Sherman Branch Nature Preserve
 Stevens Creek Nature Preserve

Major water bodies
 Catawba River
 Lake Norman
 Mountain Island Lake
 Rocky River

Adjacent counties

 Iredell County – north
 Cabarrus County – northeast
 Union County – southeast
 Lancaster County, South Carolina – south
 York County, South Carolina – southwest
 Gaston County – west
 Lincoln County – northwest

Transportation

Air
The county's primary commercial aviation airport is Charlotte Douglas International Airport in Charlotte.

Intercity rail
With twenty-five freight trains a day, Mecklenburg is a freight railroad transportation center, largely due to its place on the NS main line between Washington and Atlanta and the large volumes of freight moving in and out of the county via truck.

Mecklenburg County is served daily by three Amtrak routes.

The Crescent train connects Charlotte with New York, Philadelphia, Baltimore, Washington, Charlottesville, and Greensboro to the north, and Atlanta, Birmingham and New Orleans to the southwest.

The Carolinian train connects Charlotte with New York, Philadelphia, Baltimore, Washington, Richmond, Raleigh, Durham and Greensboro.

The Piedmont train connects Charlotte with Raleigh, Durham and Greensboro.

The Amtrak station is located at 1914 North Tryon Street. A new centralized multimodal train station, Gateway Station, has been planned for the city. It is expected to house the future LYNX Purple Line, the new Greyhound bus station, and the Crescent line that passes through Uptown Charlotte.

Mecklenburg County is the proposed southern terminus for the initial segment of the Southeast High Speed Rail Corridor operating between Charlotte and Washington, D.C. Currently in conceptual design, the SEHSR would eventually run from Washington, D.C. to Macon, Georgia.

Light rail and mass transit
Light rail service in Mecklenburg County is provided by LYNX Rapid Transit Services. Currently, the  Lynx Blue Line runs from University of North Carolina at Charlotte, through Uptown Charlotte, to Pineville; build-out is expected to be complete by 2034. The CityLynx Gold Line, a  streetcar line runs from the Charlotte Transportation Center to Hawthorne Lane & 5th Street, with additional stops to French Street in Biddleville and Sunnyside Avenue currently under construction.

Charlotte Area Transit System (CATS) bus service serves all of Mecklenburg County, including Charlotte, and the municipalities of Davidson, Huntersville, Cornelius, Matthews, Pineville, and Mint Hill.

The vintage Charlotte Trolley also operates in partnership with CATS. On July 14, 2015, the Goldrush Streetcar was revived to operate in Uptown after several decades of absence. The line runs from Trade Street, near Charlotte Transportation and Convention Center, to Elizabeth Avenue. In addition to several restaurants, this line also serves Central Piedmont Community College and Novant Health Presbyterian Hospital. The city is applying for a $50 million Federal Transportation Grant to gain funding to construct expansion of a line to serve Johnson C. Smith University to the West and East along Central Avenue.

Freight
Mecklenburg's manufacturing base, its central location on the Eastern Seaboard, and the intersection of two major interstates in the county have made it a hub for the trucking industry. Also located in the county is the Inland Port of Charlotte, which is a major rail corridor for CSX rail lines.

Major roadways

 
 
 
 
 
 
 
 
 
 
 
 
 
 
 
 
 
  Route 4

Demographics

2020 census

As of the 2020 United States census, there were 1,115,482 people, 426,313 households, and 254,759 families residing in the county.

2000 census
As of the census of 2000, there were 695,454 people, 273,416 households, and 174,986 families residing in the county. The population density was 1,322 people per square mile (510/km2). There were 292,780 housing units at an average density of 556 per square mile (215/km2). The racial makeup of the county was 64.02% White, 27.87% Black or African American, 0.35% American Indian/Alaska Native, 3.15% Asian, 0.05% Pacific Islander, 3.01% from other races, and 1.55% from two or more races. 6.45% of the population were Hispanic or Latino of any race.

There were 273,416 households, out of which 32.10% had children under the age of 18 living with them, 47.70% were married couples living together, 12.40% had a female householder with no husband present, and 36.00% were non-families. 27.60% of all households were made up of individuals, and 5.90% had someone living alone who was 65 years of age or older. The average household size was 2.49 and the average family size was 3.06.

In the county, the population was spread out, with 25.10% under the age of 18, 9.70% from 18 to 24, 36.40% from 25 to 44, 20.30% from 45 to 64, and 8.60% who were 65 years of age or older. The median age was 33 years. For every 100 females there were 96.50 males. For every 100 females age 18 and over, there were 93.60 males.

The median income for a household in the county was $50,579, and the median income for a family was $60,608. Males had a median income of $40,934 versus $30,100 for females. The per capita income for the county was $27,352. About 6.60% of families and 9.20% of the population were below the poverty line, including 11.50% of those under age 18 and 9.30% of those age 65 or over.

Law and government
Mecklenburg County is a member of the regional Centralina Council of Governments.

The county is governed by the Mecklenburg Board of County Commissioners (BOCC). The BOCC is a nine-member board made up of representatives from each of the six county districts and three at-large representatives elected by the entire county. This electoral structure favors candidates in the at-large positions who will be elected by the majority population of the county. Each District has a population of approximately 165,000 individuals. All seats are partisan and are for 2-year terms (elections occur in even years). The current chairman of the Mecklenburg BOCC is George Dunlap (D, District 3). The Current Vice-chair is Elaine Powell (D, District 1).

Members of the Mecklenburg County Commission are required by North Carolina State law to choose a chair and vice-chair once a year (at the first meeting of December). Historically, the individual elected was the 'top-vote-getter' which was one of three at-large members. In 2014 this unofficial rule was changed by the Board to allow any member to serve as Chair or vice-chair as long as they received support from 4 members plus their own vote.

The nine members of the Board of County Commissioners are:
 George Dunlap (D, District 3, chairman)
 Elaine Powell (D, District 1, Vice Chairman)
 Pat Cotham (D, At-Large)
 Leigh Altman (D, At-Large)
 Wilhelmenia Rembert (D, At-Large)
 Vilma Leake (D, District 2)
 Mark Jerrell (D, District 4)
 Laura Meier (D, District 5)
 Susan Rodriguez-McDowell (D, District 6)

Politics
Prior to 1928, Mecklenburg County was strongly Democratic, similar to most counties in the Solid South. For most of the time from 1928 to 2000, it was a bellwether county, only voting against the national winner in 1960 and 1992. For most of the second half of the 20th century, it leaned Republican in most presidential elections. From 1952 to 2000, a Democrat only won a majority of the county's vote twice, in 1964 and 1976; Bill Clinton only won a slim plurality in 1996.

However, it narrowly voted for John Kerry in 2004 even as he lost both North Carolina and the election. It swung hard to Barack Obama in 2008, giving him the highest margin for a Democrat in the county since Franklin D. Roosevelt's landslides. Obama's margin in Mecklenburg was enough for him to narrowly win the state. At the same time, John McCain became the first Republican in 64 years not to win 40 percent of the county's vote. It voted for Obama by a similar margin in 2012, and gave even more massive wins to Hillary Clinton in 2016 and Joe Biden in 2020. In 2016 and 2020, Donald Trump turned in the worst showings for a Republican in the county since the 1930s. 

Since 2008, Mecklenburg County has been one of the most Democratic urban counties in the South and the third-strongest Democratic bastion in the I-85 Corridor, behind only Orange and Durham counties.

Economy

The major industries of Mecklenburg County are banking, manufacturing, and professional services, especially those supporting banking and medicine. Mecklenburg County is home to ten Fortune 500 companies.

Wachovia, a former Fortune 500 company, had its headquarters in Charlotte until it was acquired by Wells Fargo for $15.1 billion. Wells Fargo maintains the majority of the former company's operations in Charlotte.

Goodrich Corporation, a former Fortune 500 company, had its headquarters in Charlotte until it was acquired by United Technologies Corporation for $18.4 billion. Charlotte is now the headquarters for UTC Aerospace Systems.

Education

School system
The Charlotte-Mecklenburg Schools (CMS) serves the entire county; however, the State of North Carolina also has approved a number of charter schools in Mecklenburg County (independently operated schools financed with tax dollars).

Colleges and universities

Current
 University of North Carolina at Charlotte
 Davidson College
 Queens University of Charlotte
 Central Piedmont Community College
 Johnson & Wales University
 Johnson C. Smith University
 Union Presbyterian Seminary (Charlotte campus)
 Pfeiffer University Charlotte Campus
 Wake Forest University Charlotte Campus

Former
 King's College

Libraries
The Public Library of Charlotte and Mecklenburg County serves residents of Mecklenburg County. Library cards from any branch can be used at all 20 locations. The library has an extensive collection (over 1.5 million items) of reference and popular materials including DVDs, books on CD, best sellers, downloadable media, and books.

The Billy Graham Library contains the papers and memorabilia related to the career of the well-known 20th century evangelist, Billy Graham.

Healthcare
Two major healthcare providers exist within Mecklenburg County, Atrium Health, and Novant Health. The two healthcare systems combined offer 14 emergency departments throughout Mecklenburg County, including a psychiatric emergency department and two children's emergency departments. Two hospitals in the region offer trauma services with one level I trauma center and one level III. Atrium Health, legally Charlotte-Mecklenburg Hospital Authority, is the public hospital authority of the county. 

The residents of Mecklenburg County are provided emergency medical service by MEDIC, the Mecklenburg EMS Agency. All emergency ambulance service is provided by MEDIC. No other emergency transport companies are allowed to operate within Mecklenburg County. In the fiscal year 2022, MEDIC responded to over 160,000 calls for service and transported over 107,000 patients. While MEDIC is a division of Mecklenburg County Government, a board guides and directs MEDIC that consists of members affiliated with Atrium Health, Novant Health and a swing vote provided by the Mecklenburg County Board of Commissioners. Atrium and Novant are the two major medical institutions in Charlotte, North Carolina.

Arts and culture

Museums and libraries

 Bechtler Museum of Modern Art
 Billy Graham Library
 Carolinas Aviation Museum
 Charlotte Museum of History
 Charlotte Nature Museum
 Discovery Place
 Discovery Place KIDS-Huntersville
 Harvey B. Gantt Center for African-American Arts + Culture
 ImaginOn
 Levine Museum of the New South
 McColl Center for Visual Art
 Mint Museum Randolph
 Mint Museum UPTOWN
 NASCAR Hall of Fame
 Public Library of Charlotte and Mecklenburg County

Sports and entertainment

 Carolina Panthers
 Charlotte Hornets
 Charlotte Hounds
 Charlotte Checkers
 Charlotte Knights
 Charlotte Independence
 Charlotte Motor Speedway
 Bank of America Stadium
 Truist Field
 Knights Stadium
 American Legion Memorial Stadium

Music and performing arts venues

 Actor's Theatre of Charlotte
 Bojangles' Coliseum
 Carolina Actors Studio Theatre
 ImaginOn
 Knight Theater
 Morrison YMCA Amphitheatre
 The Neighborhood Theatre in NoDa
 North Carolina Blumenthal Performing Arts Center
 Ovens Auditorium
 PNC Music Pavilion
 Spectrum Center (arena)
 Spirit Square
 Theatre Charlotte
 Uptown Amphitheatre At the NC Music Factory

Amusement parks
 Carowinds
 Great Wolf Lodge
 Ray's Splash Planet

Other attractions

 Carolina Place Mall
 Carolina Raptor Center
 Concord Mills Mall in Cabarrus County
 Lake Norman
 Lake Wylie
 Latta Plantation Nature Preserve
 Little Sugar Creek Greenway
 Mecklenburg County Aquatic Center
 Northlake Mall
 President James K. Polk Historic Site
 Ray's Splash Planet
 SouthPark Mall
 U.S. National Whitewater Center
 Charlotte Premium Outlets

Communities
Mecklenburg County contains seven municipalities including the City of Charlotte and the towns of Cornelius, Davidson, and Huntersville (north of Charlotte); and the towns of Matthews, Mint Hill, and Pineville (south and southeast of Charlotte). Small portions of Stallings and Weddington are also in Mecklenburg County, though most of those towns are in Union County. Extraterritorial jurisdictions within the county are annexed by municipalities as soon as they reach sufficient concentrations.

City
 Charlotte (county seat and largest city in the county and state)

Towns

 Cornelius
 Davidson
 Huntersville
 Matthews
 Mint Hill
 Pineville
 Stallings
 Weddington

Unincorporated communities
 Caldwell
 Hopewell
 Mountain Island
 Newell
 Prosperity Village Area
 Sterling

Townships

 Berryhill
 Charlotte
 Clear Creek
 Crab Orchard
 Deweese
 Huntersville
 Lemley
 Long Creek
 Mallard Creek
 Morning Star
 Paw Creek
 Pineville
 Providence
 Sharon (extinct)
 Steele Creek

Notable people
 Abraham Alexander (1717–1786), on the commission to establish town of Charlotte, North Carolina, North Carolina state legislator
 Evan Shelby Alexander (1767–1809), born in Mecklenburg County, later United States Congressman from North Carolina
 Nathaniel Alexander (1756–1808), born in Mecklenburg County, United States Congressman and governor of North Carolina
 Nellie Ashford (born c. 1943), folk artist born in Mecklenburg County
 Romare Bearden (1911–1988), 20th century African-American artist
 Brigadier General William Lee Davidson (1746–1781), was a North Carolina militia general during the American Revolutionary War.
 Ric Flair (born 1949), retired professional wrestler
 Anthony Foxx (born 1971), former United States Secretary of Transportation, former mayor of Charlotte.
 Judge Shirley Fulton (1952–2023), chief resident judge in the Superior Court of North Carolina
 Billy Graham (1918–2018), world-famous evangelist
 Eliza Ann Grier (1864–1902), born in Mecklenburg County, first African-American female physician in Georgia
 Anthony Hamilton (born 1971), American R&B/soul singer
 Daniel Harvey Hill (1821–1889), Confederate general during the American Civil War and a Southern scholar.
 Gen. Robert Irwin (North Carolina State Senator) (1738–1800), a distinguished commander of Patriot (American Revolution) militia forces, who is said to have been a signer of the Mecklenburg Declaration of Independence
 Pat McCrory (born 1956), former Governor of North Carolina, former seven-term Mayor of Charlotte.
 James K. Polk (1795–1849), 11th president of the United States. Polk was born in Mecklenburg County in 1795; his family moved to Tennessee when he was an adolescent.
 Colonel William Polk (1758–1834) banker, educational administrator, political leader, renowned Continental officer in the War for American Independence, and survivor of the 1777/1778 encampment at Valley Forge.
 Shannon Spake (born 1976), ESPN NASCAR correspondent

See also

 List of counties in North Carolina
 National Register of Historic Places listings in Mecklenburg County, North Carolina
 Largest cities in the US
 Carowinds, Major theme parks located partially in Mecklenburg County.

References

External links

 
 
 Mecklenburg County Parks and Recreation
 Charlotte Mecklenburg Schools
 Public Library of Charlotte and Mecklenburg County
 NCGenWeb Mecklenburg County – free genealogy resources for the county

 
1762 establishments in North Carolina
Populated places established in 1762
Charlotte metropolitan area
Majority-minority counties in North Carolina